Vladimir Ivanovich Gerasimov  (19 September 1931 – 19 May 2021) was a Soviet colonel general. He headed the 12th Chief Directorate between 1985 and 1992. He received several awards, including the Order of Lenin and Order of the Red Star.

Gerasimov died in Moscow on 19 May 2021, aged 89.

References

Soviet colonel generals
Russian colonel generals
1931 births
2021 deaths
Recipients of the Order of Lenin
Recipients of the Order of the Red Star
People from Kurgan Oblast
Recipients of the Order "For Service to the Homeland in the Armed Forces of the USSR", 2nd class
Recipients of the Order "For Service to the Homeland in the Armed Forces of the USSR", 3rd class
Military Academy of the General Staff of the Armed Forces of the Soviet Union alumni
Burials in Troyekurovskoye Cemetery